Armando Romero Rosales (born 31 March 1950) is a Mexican politician affiliated with the Institutional Revolutionary Party. He served as Municipal President of Aguascalientes from 1990 until his resignation in 1991 to serve in the 55th Legislature of the Mexican Congress.

See also
 List of mayors of Aguascalientes

References

1950 births
Living people
People from Aguascalientes City
Members of the Chamber of Deputies (Mexico)
Institutional Revolutionary Party politicians
Politicians from Aguascalientes
20th-century Mexican politicians
National Autonomous University of Mexico alumni
Municipal presidents of Aguascalientes